Herbert Schoen (18 May 1929 – 8 April 2014) was a German international footballer.

Playing career
The defender played internationally with the East Germany national team in the 1950s.

On club level he appeared in 179 Oberliga matches.

Coaching career
Herbert Schoen continued as youth coach at SC Dynamo Berlin and then BFC Dynamo after retiring as a player He trained players such as Werner Voigt and Frank Terletzki. Schoen was a tough-as-nails defender during his playing career. Voigt remembers how Schoen forced the players to throw snowballs at each other, but the players were not allowed to fend them off with their hands, they were only allowed to dodge, to increase the ability to react.  Schoen was also the first coach of Frank Terletzki. Teletzki has described Schoen as a "tough dog". He claims that learned virtues such as discipline and hardness towards oneself from Schoen. Terletzki said: "It didn't matter to us whether it was pouring rain or snowing, we always trained."

Schoen coached the youth team of BFC Dynamo in the 1966-67 season. The youth team under Schoen became East German Youth Champion (de) in the 1966-67 season, after defeating SG Dynamo Eisleben 2-0 in the replay of the final on 15 July 1967. The youth team included futured DDR-Oberliga players such as Frank Terletzki, Bernd Brillat, Wolfgang Filohn, Rainer Rohde and Gerald Schwierske. The youth team of BFC Dynamo under Schoen also won the East German Youth Cup (Youth FDGB-Pokal) in the 1967-68 season. Schoen then coached the team of juior team of BFC Dynamo in the Junior Oberliga (de) from the 1968-69 seaon. He led the team in the Junior Oberliga until the end of the first half of the 1971-72 season. Hermann Bley then took over as coach in the Junior Oberliga.
  Jürgen Bogs then became the new coach for the junior team for the 1972-73 season.  Shoen then again became the coach of the BFC Dynamo youth team. He led the youth team of BFC Dynamo in the semi-final and the final of the Youth FDGB-Pokal at the end of the 1971-72 season. The youth team of BFC Dynamo under Schoen eventually won the 1971-72 Youth FDGB-Pokal. This youth team included players such as Lutz Eigendorf,  Hans-Jürgen Riediger and Roland Jüngling.  

Schoen became the new coach of the reserve team of BFC Dynamo in 1974. BFC Dynamo II played in the second tier DDR-Liga at the time.  The team finished the 1974-75 DDR-Liga B as runner-up. The reserve teams of the 14 DDR-Oberliga clubs were no longer allowed to participate in the DDR-Liga after the 1975-76 season. The Next Generation Oberliga (de) was introduced instead. The reserve teams of the 14 DDR-Oberliga clubs would now have to continue in the Next Generation Oberliga or the third tier Bezirksliga. Youth teams of the 14 DDR-Oberliga clubs were all were eligible to start in the 1976-77 Next Generation Oberliga. BFC Dynamo II joined the Next Generation Oberliga as youth team. Schoen continued as coach of BFC Dynamo II in the Next Generation Oberliga until 1981.

Later life
Schoen remained involved in BFC Dynamo and an active member of the club into old age. Schoen died in 2014 at the age of 84.

Explanatory notes

References

External links
 
 
 

1929 births
2014 deaths
German footballers
East German footballers
East Germany international footballers
Dynamo Dresden players
Berliner FC Dynamo players
DDR-Oberliga players
Association football defenders
Sportspeople from Luckenwalde
Footballers from Brandenburg